Here I Go Again is the title of the third EP by The Hollies. It was put out by Parlophone in mono with the catalogue number GEP 8915 and released in the UK in October 1964. All songs on this EP were previously released by the Hollies at the time. Side A consisted of covers of R&B songs, tracks from the band's debut album, Stay with the Hollies while the B-side contained both sides of the "Here I Go Again" single from May 1964.

Track listing

Personnel
 Allan Clarke, lead vocals, acoustic guitar
 Graham Nash, vocals, rhythm guitar
 Tony Hicks, vocals, lead guitar
 Bobby Elliott, drums
 Eric Haydock, bass guitar

References

External links
E.P. - Here I Go Again - The Official Hollies Website

1964 EPs
Albums produced by Ron Richards (producer)
The Hollies EPs
Parlophone EPs